WBEL may refer to:

 WBEL (AM), a radio station (1380 AM) licensed to South Beloit, Illinois, United States
 WBEL-FM, a radio station (88.5 FM) licensed to Cairo, Illinois, United States
 White Box Enterprise Linux, a Linux distribution